Henry William Tilly (born 25 May 1932) is a former English cricketer.  Tilly was a right-handed batsman who bowled right-arm fast-medium. He was born at Edmonton, Middlesex.

References

External links

1932 births
Living people
People from Edmonton, London
English cricketers
Middlesex cricketers
Marylebone Cricket Club cricketers
Hertfordshire cricketers
Minor Counties cricketers